Greece competed at the 2017 European Athletics Indoor Championships in Belgrade, Serbia, from 3 to 5 March 2017 with a team of 7 athletes (3 men and 4 women) in six events.

Medals

Results

See also
 Greece at the European Athletics Indoor Championships

References

2017
European Athletics Championships